Tomáš Poláček (born 29 August 1980) is a Czech professional football midfielder playing for FC Přední Kopanina.

Club career
Born in Planá u Mariánských Lázní, he started playing for SK Slavia Praha at the age of 14.  In 2000 FK Siad Most bought him from Slavia. In fall 2005 they were promoted to Czech first league. On 1 August 2005 after the 4th round unexpectedly Sparta Prague bought him.  He played as starter all 6 group matches of the 2005–06 UEFA Champions League however Sparta ended up 4th and eliminated in the group. In July 2006 he joined FK Mladá Boleslav, where he played until 2010.

In February 2011 after a successful trial Poláček signed with Serbian club FK Sloboda Point Sevojno. He left Serbia in summer 2011 and returned to the Czech Republic where he joined FK Chmel Blšany. In 2014, after a spell at FC Chabry, he joined FC Přední Kopanina.

International career
Tomáš Poláček has represented Czech Republic at U-15 and U-18 levels.

Honours
Sparta Prague
Czech Cup: 2006

References

External links 
 
 
 Tomáš Poláček at AC Sparta Prague
 Tomáš Poláček at Utakmica.rs

1980 births
Living people
People from Planá
Czech footballers
Czech expatriate footballers
SK Slavia Prague players
FK Baník Most players
AC Sparta Prague players
FK Mladá Boleslav players
Czech First League players
FK Sloboda Užice players
Serbian SuperLiga players
Expatriate footballers in Serbia
FK Chmel Blšany players
Association football midfielders
Sportspeople from the Plzeň Region